Kalgan may refer to:

 Kalgan, Western Australia, a town
Kalgan River, in Western Australia
An earlier name for Zhangjiakou, in Hebei Province, China
A name used by World Of Warcraft developer Tom Chilton (game developer)